The Baltimore Tribe was a member of the American Lacrosse League, a short lived professional lacrosse league in 1988, that was based in Catonsville, Maryland. The Tribe played their home games at the University of Maryland, Baltimore County. The original General Manager was Bob Griebe. Mark Glagola replaced Griebe, who resigned c. May 14, 1988. Frank Messanotte was the head coach. Brooks Sweet and Brian Wood played for the Tribe. Other players were Peter and Brent Voelkel, Chris Walker, Brad Kotz, Todd Curry and goalie Gavin Moag. The team colors were Carolina Blue and White.  The Tribe had a 2–2 record when the league folded.

References

Lacrosse teams in Maryland
Lacrosse in Baltimore
Catonsville, Maryland
1988 establishments in Maryland
Lacrosse clubs established in 1988
Sports clubs disestablished in 1988
1988 disestablishments in Maryland